Souleymane Konaté (born 20 September 1989) is a Malian professional footballer who plays as a defender for Malaysian club PDRM FA. He formerly play for Stade Malien.

International career
In January 2014, coach Djibril Dramé, invited him to be a part of the Mali squad for the 2014 African Nations Championship. He helped the team to the quarter finals where they lost to Zimbabwe by two goals to one.

References

Living people
Mali international footballers
Malian footballers
Expatriate footballers in Sudan
2014 African Nations Championship players
PDRM FA players
1989 births
Association football central defenders
21st-century Malian people
Mali A' international footballers
2011 African Nations Championship players
Malian expatriate sportspeople in Sudan
Malian expatriate footballers
Stade Malien players